Abkhazian railway is a rail operator in the partially recognised state of Abkhazia. Under a monopoly agreement, it is fully managed and partially owned by Russian Railways for a ten year contract from 2009-2019.

In 2016, 307,748 people traveled between Abkhazia and Russia by rail.

History
After the dissolution of the Soviet Union and damaging of the Transcaucasian Railway lines, the Samtredskoye part to the west of the Inguri River came under control of the Abkhazian railway.

The bridge over the Inguri River was blown up on 14 August 1992, which was the day when Georgian forces entered Abkhazia and is the date considered as the start of the War in Abkhazia. The pretext for sending the Georgian National Guard to Abkhazia in 1992 was to protect the railroad. The bridge was subsequently restored but blown up again in 1993, after the end of the war.

The track between Achigvara and the Inguri River was dismantled. The rest of the railway line also suffered greatly during the war. After the war ended, traffic was restored along the line. The railway system of Abkhazia was isolated in the 1990s, due to the blockade imposed by Russia.

On 25 December 2002, the Sochi-Sukhumi elektrichka train made its first run since the war, which led to Georgian protests. Part of the line, 60 kilometers of track between Zugdidi and Ochamchire, had been removed and sold for scrap prior to reopening. 

As the number of Russian tourists greatly increased in the 2000s, the Psou-Sukhumi section was mainly repaired by Russia in 2004 and on 10 September 2004 the Moscow-Sukhumi train first arrived in the capital of Abkhazia.

The Ochamchire-Sukhumi, Sochi-Sukhumi and Tkvarcheli-Sukhumi elektrichkas, that had operated at various times from 1993, no longer operated by 2007 due to various infrastructure problems. The last of the elektrichka, Gudauta-Sukhumi, was closed down on the end of 2007. The Sukhumi-Ochamchira section was restored in 2008 by Russian Railway Troops.

On 15 May 2009, the President of Abkhazia, Sergei Bagapsh, announced, that Abkhazia's railway and airport would be transferred to Russia with management rights for ten years, a decision, which caused a negative outcry in Abkhazia. According to the Abkhaz tycoon and opposition party leader, Beslan Butba, this has led to growing anti-Russian sentiment in Abkhazia.

The Adler-Gagra train service was resumed on 26 June 2010 by the Don-Prigorod company.

Russian Railways restored a 130 km section of the railway in mid-2011 using a 2 billion ruble loan from the Russian government. Regular passenger services from Moscow and Sochi were also restored.

Operation
The railway is administered by the Abkhazskaya Zheleznaya Doroga company. As of 2016, there is a daily long-distance train between Moscow and Sukhumi, and some suburban trains between Adler and Gagra.

Currently, there is only one train connection from the Russian Federation to Abkhazia. The train from Moscow to Sukhumi operates daily at the high touristic season in summer and twice a week at the low season. The additional trains from Belgorod and St. Petersburg operate during the summer months which is the main tourist season.

Link to Georgia
There have been proposals to re-establish rail traffic between Russia and the Trans-Caucasian countries of Armenia and Georgia. The alternative route through Azerbaijan is significantly longer and not available at all, in the case of Armenia, due to the Nagorno-Karabakh conflict.

Abkhazia and Russia signed a protocol on repairing the Abkhazian stretch in October 1995, but Georgia has long tied the restoration of rail traffic with the return of refugees to Abkhazia. Negotiations to restore the railway link between Georgia and Abkhazia were held in 2004-2005, but ultimately stalled.

In late 2012 and early 2013, the new Georgian government under Prime Minister Ivanishvili repeatedly proposed to revamp the Abkhazian Railway and getting it hooked on the Georgian Railways, specifically to appease Armenia, and enabling a commercial link to Russia.

The proposal sparked domestic and international discussion in Armenia (the country with the most commercial interest in such a connection), in Azerbaijan (which has fears it enables Russia with a more efficient military transport to its base in Gyumri, Armenia) and in Russia (Russian Railways owning the Armenian-based South Caucasus Railways).

The Abkhaz authorities first reacted dismissively to cooperate with such initiative, but later changed their tone. Azerbaijan shortly threatened with consequences for the Baku–Tbilisi–Kars railway connection, then due completion at the end of 2013, and suggested raising the gas price charged to Georgia. In Georgia there is still sharp opposition to reopen this railway link.

Infrastructure
This connection was severed as a result of the War in Abkhazia.

References

External links

Republican Unitary Enterprise "Abkhazian railway" 
 

Rail transport in Abkhazia